Ferrol, officially the Municipality of Ferrol,  is a 6th class municipality in the province of Romblon, Philippines. According to the 2020 census, it has a population of 8,005 people.

History
Ferrol was established in 1850 as a barrio of Odiongan by the Spanish colonial authorities. They discovered the place 10 kilometers south-west after repulsing and chasing a convoy of Muslim pirates that attacked Odiongan. The Spaniards noticed the resemblance of the bay of the vicinity similar to that of Ferrol, Spain, which is the home port of Spain's Maritime Department of the North; hence the town's name.

In 1978, in order to consolidate the Onhan-speaking barangays of Odiongan into one municipality, Assemblyman Nemesio Ganan Jr. authored a bill in the Congress of the Philippines which created Ferrol, together with the barangays of Agnocnoc, Bunsoran, Hinagoman, Tubigon, and Claro M. Recto into a new municipality. On 11 June 1978, Ferrol formally became the 16th municipality in Romblon by virtue of Presidential Decree No. 1492, signed by President Ferdinand Marcos.

Geography
Ferrol is located on Tablas Island. It is bounded on the north by Odiongan, on the west by the Tablas Strait, on the east by Santa Maria, and on the south by Looc. It has a total land area of 26.72 km2.

Barangays

Ferrol is politically subdivided into 6 barangays:

 Agnonoc
 Bunsoran
 Claro M. Recto
 Poblacion
 Hinaguman
 Tubigon

Climate

Demographics

According to the 2015 census, it has a population of 6,964 people. Onhan, together with Tagalog, Hiligaynon, and English, is the medium of communication in business and trade.

Economy 

Ferrol has the highest level of vegetable production in Romblon. Livestock and rice farming are also present in the coastal areas which is mostly for home consumption and grown in small scale. Other economic opportunities include copra farming, fish cultivation, agricultural manufacturing and retail, and tourism. The Tablas Island Electric cooperative supplies 41.78% of households in Ferrol with electricity. As for water supply, the town has a Level 3 water supply system and a Level 4 irrigation system with 75 service areas.

Landline and cellular phone services from PLDT, Smart, and Globe are already available in Ferrol. The town is connected to nearby Odiongan and other municipalities through the Tablas Circumferential Road. Jeepneys and tricycles are the common form of land transportation. A port in Barangay Agnocnoc caters to intra-provincial travel and fishing vessels.

Tourist attractions and transport

Beaches near Ferrol include Binucot, Atabay and Guin-awayan beaches. Caves the Mabaho and Burobintana caves. The town is accessible via Odiongan by RORO vessels from Batangas City or Roxas, Oriental Mindoro. It is also accessible via Tugdan Airport in Alcantara town, where Cebu Pacific has flights from Manila four times weekly.

Government

Pursuant to Chapter II, Title II, Book III of Republic Act 7160 or the Local Government Code of 1991, the municipal government is composed of a mayor (alkalde), a vice mayor (bise alkalde) and members (kagawad) of the legislative branch Sangguniang Bayan alongside a secretary to the said legislature, all of which are elected to a three-year term and are eligible to run for three consecutive terms.

Jovencio "Jun" Mayor, Jr. and Antonio Compas of the PDP–Laban, are the incumbent mayor and vice mayor of Ferrol as of 30 June 2019.

References

External links

Ferrol Profile at PhilAtlas.com
Ferrol Profile - Cities and Municipalities Competitive Index
[ Philippine Standard Geographic Code]
Philippine Census Information
Local Governance Performance Management System 

Municipalities of Romblon